Petar Zhabov, born 7 December 1973 in Burgas, is a former Bulgarian footballer and captain of the under-21 national team. He spent his career in Bulgaria and Italy.

Career
As a forward for CSKA Sofia, Zhabov was instrumental in winning both the title and cup in 1997. He was subsequently purchased by Cosenza and remained in Italy until the end of his career.

In 2005, he returned to his hometown of Primorsko, where he opened a hotel and became involved in youth soccer programs.

References

External links
Player Profile at Fullsoccer.eu

1973 births
Living people
Bulgarian footballers
Bulgarian expatriate footballers
FC Chernomorets Burgas players
PFC CSKA Sofia players
Cosenza Calcio 1914 players
S.S.D. Lucchese 1905 players
A.C. Cesena players
U.S. Pistoiese 1921 players
Taranto F.C. 1927 players
Calcio Lecco 1912 players
First Professional Football League (Bulgaria) players
Serie B players
Association football forwards
Expatriate footballers in Italy
Sportspeople from Burgas